The Corn Is Green is a 1979 American made-for-television drama film starring Katharine Hepburn as a schoolteacher determined to bring education to a Welsh coal mining town, despite great opposition. It was directed by George Cukor, the tenth and last collaboration on film between the director and the actress, and is the second and last made-for-television film directed  by Cukor. The filming was done in Wales. It was adapted from the 1938 play of the same name by Emlyn Williams, and had previously been filmed in 1945 with Bette Davis in the main role.

The film was telecast by CBS on January 29, 1979. It received two Emmy nominations, including Outstanding Lead Actress in a Limited Series or a Special for Katharine Hepburn.
It also aired on HBO in June 1983.

Plot
Middle-aged Lilly Moffatt (Katharine Hepburn) sets up a school in a Welsh coal mining town, despite the determined opposition of the local squire (Bill Fraser). Eventually, she considers giving up. Then she discovers a promising student Morgan Evans (Ian Saynor), a miner seemingly destined for a life of hard work and heavy drink. With renewed hope, she works hard to help him realise his potential.

Through diligence and perseverance, Morgan gets the opportunity to take an examination for Oxford University with, hopefully, a prized scholarship. Moffatt, the rest of the teachers, and their students are hopeful Morgan will pass the Oxford interview, and so he does.

However, Bessie Watty (Toyah Willcox), a young woman who has recently given birth to Morgan's child, blackmails the faculty into giving her part of Morgan's scholarship money in order to help raise the baby. The conniving young woman has designs on another male suitor.  Instead, Moffatt volunteers to adopt the child so that Morgan's academic future will not be ruined and Watty will be free to marry another man, unfettered by her responsibility to the child (since she and her affianced never really cared for it in the first place). Morgan quickly hears about Watty's scandalous, self-serving motives, and insists upon raising the child himself. Through a heartfelt and persuasive conversation, Moffatt convinces the young man to continue his higher education and contribute something to the world.

Cast
 Katharine Hepburn as Miss Lilly Moffat 
 Ian Saynor as Morgan Evans 
 Bill Fraser as The Squire 
 Patricia Hayes as Mrs. Watty 
 Anna Massey as Miss Ronberry 
 Artro Morris as John Goronwy Jones 
 Dorothea Phillips as Sarah Pugh 
 Toyah Willcox as Bessie Watty (as Toyah Wilcox)
 Huw Richards as Idwal
 Bryn Fon as Robbart
 Dyfon Roberts as Gwyn
 Robbin John as Ivor (as Robin John)

See also
 List of American films of 1979

References

External links
 
 
 

1979 television films
1979 films
1979 drama films
1970s English-language films
American drama television films
American films based on plays
CBS network films
Films about educators
Films directed by George Cukor
Films scored by John Barry (composer)
Films set in Wales
Films shot in Wales
1970s American films